Aes Dana may refer to:

Áes dána or Tuatha Dé Danann, an ancient people of Irish mythology; the ancestral gods of Ireland
 Aes Dana (band), a French Celtic black metal band
 Aois-dàna (also spelled "áes dána"), the Scottish Gaelic or Old Irish "people of the arts" until the late 17th century
 Aosdána, an Irish organisation of people who have achieved distinction in the arts